Shahnavaz-e Olya (also Romanized as Shahnavāz-e ‘Olyā; also known as Shahnavāz) is a village in Quri Chay-ye Sharqi Rural District, in the Central District of Charuymaq County, East Azerbaijan Province, Iran. At the 2006 census, its population was 149, in 31 families.

References 

Populated places in Charuymaq County